Heavies may refer to multiple instances of:

 Heavy artillery
 Heavy cavalry
 Heavy cruisers
 Villains, also called "heavies"

See also
 Heavy (disambiguation)